Dellinger is a lunar impact crater that is located on the Moon's far side. It is attached to the southern rim of the crater Pannekoek. To the southeast lies the crater Marconi, and to the southwest is Chauvenet.

The outer rim of this crater is eroded in places, including an outward protrusion along the southern rim and particularly along the northern half. There is a pair of small craters on the northwestern part of the interior floor.

Satellite craters
By convention these features are identified on lunar maps by placing the letter on the side of the crater midpoint that is closest to Dellinger.

References

 
 
 
 
 
 
 
 
 
 
 
 

Impact craters on the Moon